Mini Lindy was a line of small plastic model kits, about the size of Matchbox or Hot Wheels cars. They were part of the "Lindberg Line". They had rubber tires, chrome wheels and clear windshields. The axles were fit under a plastic tab that provided limited suspension actions. Some of the subjects are difficult to find under other formats, such as Hot Wheels. These are often mistaken for Hot Wheels or slot cars, and are fairly rare, but can be found on eBay and websites.

Some of the car subjects:

 Porsche Carrera
 Ford Pickup
 Corvette Stingray
 Jaguar XKE
 Ford Mustang (1968)
 Jeep Jeepster (1968) with CJ grille
 Volkswagen Camper
 Chevy Van (Flat windshield)
 Chevrolet Camaro (1968)
 Fire Engine
 Dump Truck (GMC)
 Greyhound Bus
 Mail Truck
 Cement Truck
 Cement Mixer
 MG-TD Sports Car
 Tow Truck
 Austin-Healey 3000
 Volkswagen Beetle
 Mercedes SSK
 1930 Packard
 Ford Camper
 School Bus
 Tractor Trailer
 Ford GT
 Porsche Targa
 Ford Maverick (1970 2 dr)
 AMC AMX
 Ford Cobra
 Dodge Charger
 Dune Buggy
 Ryder Truck
 Cadillac Eldorado
 Continental Mark III
 Chevrolet Vega
 Buick Riviera (1971)
 Pontiac Grand Prix
 Chevrolet Corvette (1970)
 AMC Gremlin
 Chevrolet Monte Carlo

The last 8 were part of the Lindberg "Super Sport" series.

References
 Mini-Lindy reference page
 Gasoline Alley Lindberg kits

Toy cars and trucks